Michela Cobisi (born 4 November 1982 in Milan) is an Italian retired pair skater. With partner Ruben De Pra, she is the 2001 & 2002 Italian national champion. They placed 19th at the 2002 Winter Olympics.

Results
(with De Pra)

References

External links
 Tracings.net profile
 Pairs on Ice: Cobisi & De Pra

Italian female pair skaters
Olympic figure skaters of Italy
Figure skaters at the 2002 Winter Olympics
1982 births
Living people
Figure skaters from Milan